Basílio do Nascimento Martins (14 June 1950 – 30 October 2021) was the East Timorese Roman Catholic Bishop of Baucau.

He was born in Suai, then Portuguese Timor. He later moved to Portugal, where he was ordained as a priest in Évora, in 1977. He worked for 20 years in Portugal and France before returning home in 1994, which was at the time under Indonesian occupation.

He became apostolic administrator of the new Diocese of Baucau on 30 November 1996 and titular bishop on 6 January 1997. When Carlos Filipe Ximenes Belo retired, Nascimento became apostolic administrator of the Diocese of Dili, until the new Bishop of Dili, Alberto Ricardo da Silva, was installed on 6 March 2004. Nascimento then became the Bishop of Baucau.

In October 1999, the President of the National Council of Timorese Resistance Xanana Gusmão thanked Bishop Nascimento for the support of the Church in the struggle for independence.

Concerned that the names of the thousands of lives lost during Indonesia's occupation of the country will be forgotten in the name of reconciliation with Indonesia, on 21 January 2006 he said that reconciliation with Jakarta without justice is meaningless.

On 31 March 2018, Nascimento collapsed during Mass at St. Anthony's Cathedral in Baucau and was rushed to Dili National Hospital. He recovered and was discharged on 4 April 2018. He was the head of the East Timorese Bishops' conference.

Bishop do Nascimento died from a heart attack on 30 October 2021, in the Guido Valadares National Hospital in Dili. The President of East Timor Francisco Guterres awarded Nascimento with the country's highest honour, the Order of Timor-Leste.

References

External links

 Basílio do Nascimento at catholic-hierarchy.org

1950 births
2021 deaths
Roman Catholic bishops of Dili
Roman Catholic bishops of Baucau
East Timorese Roman Catholic bishops
People from Cova Lima District
East Timorese expatriates in Portugal
21st-century Roman Catholic bishops in East Timor
Recipients of the Order of Timor-Leste